Fútbol Club Motagua Reservas is a Honduran football team based in Tegucigalpa, Honduras.

Founded in 2010, it is the reserve team of F.C. Motagua and currently plays in the Honduran Liga Nacional Reserves.

History
For the 2010–11 season the team was disaffiliated from the Liga Nacional de Ascenso as they didn't register to compete, this because they joined the new reserves league.

Honours

Domestic competitions
 Reserves League
 Winners (3): 2011–12 C, 2013–14 A, 2016–17 A
 Runners-up (5): 2010–11 C, 2012–13 C, 2013–14 C, 2014–15 A, 2017–18 A

References

Football clubs in Honduras
Football clubs in Tegucigalpa